Jacek Borcuch (born 17 April 1970) is a Polish actor, screenwriter and film director. He contributed to more than fifteen films since 1995.

Selected filmography

References

External links 

1970 births
Living people
Polish male film actors
Polish screenwriters
Polish film directors